Ruth Lamsbach (born 1950) is a German paralympic athlete and multiple medalist at the Paralympic Games .

She received the Silver Laurel Leaf on June 23, 1993.

Career 
At the 1968 Summer Paralympic Games in Tel Aviv, she won a bronze medal in the 25 meters freestyle, and silver medal in breaststroke.

At the 1972 Summer Paralympics, she competed in both pentathlon and wheelchair tennis. She became a Paralympic champion in the pentathlon.

Since 1976, she transitioned to table tennis. She competed in the 1976 Summer Paralympics, and 1980 Summer Paralympics, winning a bronze medal in singles 2. 

At the 1984 Summer Paralympics , she won a gold in Open 1B-4, and bronze in the singles 2 class. 

She also took part in the 1988 Summer Paralympics winning a silver medal in Singles 2, and 1992 Paralympic Games winning a gold medal in 1992 in the Teams 3 class. 

At the 1990 World Championships, she won the world title in singles and doubles.

References 

1950 births
Living people
Sportspeople from Bochum
Paralympic archers of Germany
Paralympic athletes of Germany
Paralympic swimmers of Germany
Paralympic table tennis players of Germany
Paralympic wheelchair basketball players of Germany
German female archers
German wheelchair racers
German female shot putters
German female breaststroke swimmers
German female freestyle swimmers
German female table tennis players
Archers at the 1972 Summer Paralympics
Athletes (track and field) at the 1972 Summer Paralympics
Athletes (track and field) at the 1976 Summer Paralympics
Swimmers at the 1968 Summer Paralympics
Table tennis players at the 1976 Summer Paralympics
Table tennis players at the 1980 Summer Paralympics
Table tennis players at the 1984 Summer Paralympics
Table tennis players at the 1988 Summer Paralympics
Table tennis players at the 1992 Summer Paralympics
Wheelchair basketball players at the 1976 Summer Paralympics
Paralympic gold medalists for Germany
Paralympic silver medalists for Germany
Paralympic bronze medalists for Germany